Adriana Aparecida Costa (born 16 April 1983), known as Tiga and Tiganinha, is a Brazilian retired footballer who played as a forward. She is also a former futsal player who operated as a pivot.

Club career
Tiga has exclusively played for Brazilian clubs in both football and futsal.

Controversy
From 2011 to 2016, Tiga made appearances for Equatorial Guinea despite having no connection with the African nation. She was first recruited to play at the 2011 FIFA Women's World Cup. She was later a member of the squad that won the 2012 Women's African Football Championship. On 5 October 2017, she and other nine Brazilian footballers were declared by FIFA as ineligible to play for Equatorial Guinea.

International goals
Scores and results list Equatorial Guinea's goal tally first

References

1983 births
Living people
Footballers from São Paulo
Brazilian women's futsal players
Futsal forwards
Brazilian women's footballers
Women's association football forwards
Sport Club Corinthians Paulista (women) players
São Paulo FC (women) players

Equatorial Guinea women's international footballers
2011 FIFA Women's World Cup players